Pileanthus septentrionalis is a plant species of the family Myrtaceae endemic to Western Australia.

It blooms between August and October producing white flowers.

It is found on sand dunes in the Gascoyne and Pilbara regions of Western Australia around Northampton where it grows in sandy-loamy soils.

References

septentrionalis
Plants described in 2002
Taxa named by Gregory John Keighery
Endemic flora of Western Australia